Ophiocordyceps myrmecophila is a species of fungus that parasitizes insect hosts, in particular members of the order Hymenoptera.

Distribution
Ophiocordyceps myrmecophila has been noted as one of the more dominant entomopathogenic fungi of formicine ants in the tropical rainforests of Thailand. This species and others like it can parasitize multiple arthropod hosts. Although entomopathogenic fungi have been identified as a widespread organism, tending obviously to be found in similar habitats to that of their arthropod host; ubiquity of the host, as well as evolutionary cospeciation are key factors of host specificity and therefore location.

Phylogeny
The new genus was separated recently from an 'outdated' entomopathogenic genus, Cordyceps, due to DNA analysis and phylogenetic differences in stromata and apices.

References

Ophiocordycipitaceae
Fungi described in 1846